Peter Manning (born 1956) is a British conductor and violinist.

Peter or Pete Manning may also refer to:
Peter K. Manning (born 1940), American sociologist
Peter Manning (footballer), former Australian rules footballer
Pete Manning (gridiron football) (1937–2019), American and Canadian football player
Pete Manning, character in Alibi